Nallambal Lake (French: Lac Nalambal) is the only lake artificially made in Karaikal district, Puducherry. This lake was made in the village of Nallambal near Thirunallar town. The government of Puducherry created this lake artificially to satisfy the irrigational needs of farmers. It also has plans to turn the lake into a tourist spot.

References 

Lakes of Puducherry